Sir William Harbord, 1st Baronet (c. 1696 – 17 February 1770), of Gunton and Suffield, Norfolk,  was an English landowner and politician who sat in the House of Commons from between 1734 and 1754.

Early life
Harbord was born  William Morden, the eldest son of John Morden of Suffield  and his wife Judith Cropley, daughter of William Cropley of Shelland in Suffolk. He went to school in Thurlow and Bury St Edmunds before being admitted at Caius College, Cambridge on 4 February 1713 aged 16. In 1716, he was admitted at Middle Temple. He succeeded his father to the Suffield estate in 1726. He married Elizabeth Britiffe, daughter of Robert Britiffe, Recorder of Norwich on 25 April 1732.

Career
As Morden, he was returned unopposed as Member of Parliament for Bere Alston by his neighbour Sir John Hobart, 5th Baronet at a by-election on 5 February 1734. At the 1734 British general election with the heavy financial backing of Robert Walpole, he stood and lost at Norfolk. He was returned unopposed as MP for Dunwich at a by-election on 21 February 1738. At the 1741 British general election he went back to Bere Alston where he was returned unopposed. 

In 1742, Morden inherited the Norfolk properties of his mother's brother Harbord Harbord, and assumed the surname Harbord in place of that of Morden by royal licence to meet the will's conditions. In the 1740s he began the construction of Gunton Hall designed by the architect Matthew Brettingham.   He was made a Knight Companion of the Order of the Bath on 28 May 1744 and a baronet on 22 March 1746. He was returned unopposed again at the 1747 British general election. He voted consistently for the Government. He retired at the 1754 British general election.

Death and legacy
Harbord  died on 17 February 1770, leaving two sons. His eldest son Harbord (1734–1810) succeeded to the baronetcy.

References

1770 deaths
Knights Companion of the Order of the Bath
Baronets in the Baronetage of Great Britain
British MPs 1727–1734
British MPs 1734–1741
British MPs 1741–1747
British MPs 1747–1754
Members of the Parliament of Great Britain for Bere Alston
People from North Norfolk (district)
Alumni of Gonville and Caius College, Cambridge
Whig members of the Parliament of Great Britain
Year of birth uncertain